

Ottoman Empire
 Principality of Abkhazia – Arslan Begi (1806–1810)

Portugal
 Angola – António de Saldanha da Gama, Governor of Angola (1807–1810)
 Macau –
 Bernardo Aleixo de Lemos e Faria, Governor of Macau (1806–1808)
 Lucas Jose de Alvarenga, Governor of Macau (1808–1810)

Spanish Empire
Viceroyalty of New Granada – Antonio José Amar y Borbón Arguedas, Viceroy of New Granada (1803–1810)
Viceroyalty of New Spain – 
José Joaquín Vicente de Iturrigaray y Aróstegui, Viceroy of New Spain (1803–1808)
Pedro de Garibay, Viceroy of New Spain (1808–1809)
Captaincy General of Cuba – Salvador José de Muro, 2nd Marquis of Someruelos, Governor of Cuba (1799–1812)
Spanish East Indies – Mariano Fernández de Folgueras, Governor-General of the Philippines (1806–1810)
Commandancy General of the Provincias Internas - Nemesio Salcedo y Salcedo (1802–1813)
Viceroyalty of Peru – José Fernando Abascal y Sousa, marqués de la Concordia, Viceroy of Peru (1806–1816)
Captaincy General of Chile – 
Luis Muñoz de Guzmán, Governor and Captain-General of Chile (1802–1808)
Juan Rodríguez Ballesteros, Governor and Captain General of Chile (1808)
Francisco Antonio García Carrasco Díaz, Governor and Captain-General of Chile (1808–1810)
Viceroyalty of the Río de la Plata – Santiago de Liniers, Viceroy of the Río de la Plata (1807–1809)

United Kingdom
 Cayman Islands – William Bodden, Chief Magistrate of the Cayman Islands (1776–1823)
 Malta – Alexander Ball, Civil Commissioner of Malta (1802–1809)
 New South Wales – 
William Bligh, de jure Governor of New South Wales (1806–1808), imprisoned after the Rum Rebellion
John Macarthur and officers of the New South Wales Corps de facto rulers of the colony

Colonial governors
Colonial governors
1808